Marie Patouillet (born 7 August 1988) is a French cyclist. She competed at the women's individual pursuit C5 event at the 2020 Summer Paralympics, winning bronze. She also won the silver medal in the women's time trial at the 2019 UCI Para-cycling Track World Championships

References

External links
 

Living people
1988 births
Paralympic cyclists of France
French female cyclists
Cyclists at the 2020 Summer Paralympics
Medalists at the 2020 Summer Paralympics
Paralympic bronze medalists for France
Sportspeople from Versailles, Yvelines
Cyclists from Île-de-France
21st-century French women